Kelachay District is a district (bakhsh) in Rudsar County, Gilan Province, Iran. At the 2006 census, its population was 34,268, in 9,878 families.  The District has two cities: Kelachay and Vajargah.  The District has two rural districts (dehestan): Bibalan Rural District and Machian Rural District.

References 

Rudsar County
Districts of Gilan Province